These are the rosters of all participating teams at the women's water polo tournament at the 2019 World Aquatics Championships.

Age as of the start of the tournament, 14 July 2019.

Group A

Netherlands
The following is the Dutch roster.

Head coach: Arno Havenga

New Zealand
The following is the New Zealand roster.

Head coach: Angela Winstanley-Smith

South Africa
The following is the South African roster.

Head coach: Pierre le Roux

United States
The following is the American roster.

Head coach: Adam Krikorian

Group B

Canada
The following is the Canadian roster.

Head coach: David Paradelo

Hungary
The following is the Hungarian roster.

Head coach: Attila Bíró

Russia
The following is the Russian roster.

Head coach: Alexandr Gaidukov

South Korea
The following is the Korean roster.

Group C

Cuba
The following is the Cuban roster.

Head coach: Jorge del Valle

Greece
The following is the Greek roster.

Head coach: Giorgos Morfesis

Kazakhstan
The following is the Kazakh roster.

Head coach: Marat Naurazbekov

Spain
The following is the Spanish roster.

Head coach: Miki Oca

Group D

Australia
The following is the Australian roster.

Head coach: Predrag Mihailović

China
The following is the Chinese roster.

Head coach: Gong Dali

Italy
The following is the Italian roster.

Head coach: Fabio Conti

Japan
The following is the Japanese roster.

Head coach: Makihiro Motomiya

References

External links
Official website
Records and statistics (reports by Omega)

World Aquatics Championships water polo squads
Women's team rosters